A reciprocal inter-insurance exchange or simply a reciprocal is an unincorporated association in which subscribers exchange insurance policies to pool and spread risk.  For consumers, reciprocal exchanges often offer similar policies to those offered by a stock company or a mutual insurance company.  Large reciprocal exchanges in the United States include USAA, Farmers, and Erie.

History 
Reciprocals began in 1881 when dry-good merchants in New York were discontent with their experience with other insurers in covering their buildings. The store owners believed that they had well-maintained buildings and were being overcharged by risk rating methodologies used by insurers at the time.  Because the merchants were well-capitalized and could absorb certain losses, they decided to self-insure to lower their insurance costs. Subscribers indemnified each other when a member suffered a loss, but the process of collecting from those who did not suffer and remitting funds to those who did suffer losses proved cumbersome.  Reciprocal exchanges managed by attorneys-in-fact thus were organized to address this problem.

How a reciprocal operates 
"Reciprocal insurance" means insurance resulting from the mutual exchange of insurance contracts among persons in an unincorporated association under a common name through an attorney-in-fact having authority to obligate each person both as insured and insurer.

This definition implies three parties: the Subscribers (policyholders), the exchange (an unincorporated association), and the attorney-in-fact.  

Each policyholder is a subscriber to the exchange.  Subscribers do not "own" and are not "owners" of the exchange, as it is an unincorporated association and thus has no owners.  However, subscribers often have a governance role over the exchange (such as an advisory committee or Board of Governors).  In some reciprocal exchanges, operating surplus generated by the exchange belongs to the subscribers but is held by the exchange in accounts called subscriber savings accounts, and the attorney-in-fact may return unneeded money to the subscribers under some circumstances.  Subscribers may be natural persons, LLCs or LPs, partnerships, or corporations.   

The attorney-in-fact, using a power of attorney from the subscribers, is authorized to administer the reciprocal exchange and run its day-to-day operations, including issuing policies, filing rates, managing investments and handling claims. The attorney-in-fact can solicit and admit new subscribers to the exchange. The attorney-in-fact may be an individual, partnership or corporate entity. In exchange for its services, the attorney-in-fact receives payment from fees charged to the exchange. The AIF may be owned by the reciprocal (a proprietary reciprocal) or contracted from a third party (a non-proprietary reciprocal).

Reciprocal insurance policies are typically nonassessable, keeping the policyholders from being charged an additional amount of money if the cost of operating the reciprocal exchange is higher than expected. Reciprocals also issue assessable policies.

Insurance in the United States is principally regulated by each of the states, as provided for by the McCarran–Ferguson Act.  There is a considerable variation in how state law governs reciprocal exchanges. Some states have specific laws governing reciprocal exchanges, while others subsume regulation of reciprocal exchanges under the regulations governing captive insurers.

Reciprocals can be started directly by policyholders or by an attorney-in-fact.  In theory, a small group of individuals or companies could band together to insure one another and form a reciprocal.  In consumer insurance, more recently, entrepreneurs have formed attorneys-in-fact which then form reciprocals by providing the initial capital, attracting subscribers, and managing the exchange.  In some states, municipalities form reciprocals to cross-indemnify towns, cities, villages, and counties.

Comparison to other forms of insurance 
Reciprocals are sometimes confused with mutual insurance companies.  While both reciprocals and mutuals may offer similar products, there are differences.  A reciprocal is unincorporated; a mutual is incorporated and thus can say that it is "owned" by its policyholders.  However, in both a reciprocal and a mutual, it may be difficult for widely-dispersed policyholders to force material changes in governance.  A mutual insurance company is often self-managed, and policyholders may have a role in electing the board of directors.  Mutuals are typically thought of as being not-for-profit, but mutuals can own for-profit stock insurance companies.  While the reciprocal exchange itself is technically not-for-profit, it can accumulate surplus, the attorney-in-fact may have a profit motive, and the attorney-in-fact may have profit-seeking external shareholders who are not the subscribers.  

In 1981, Congress authorized the creation of risk retention groups (RRGs) to provide certain forms of commercial liability insurance.  RRGs and multi-parent captives have similar characteristics to reciprocals, notably the concept of similarly-situated parties agreeing to insure each other.  While reciprocals can offer both personal and commercial insurance, RRGs and captives are more restricted in their product offerings, membership, and governance.

Examples 
 Adirondack Insurance Exchange (AIE)
American Automobile Association (AAA)
Armed Forces Insurance Exchange (AFI)
 Erie Insurance Group
 Farmers Insurance Group
 PURE Insurance
 USAA (United Services Automobile Association)

See also
Captive insurance
Limited liability company
Limited partnership
Mutual insurance
Risk retention group

References

Notes

External links 
Texas Insurance Code Subsection on Interinsurance Exchanges

Types of business entity
Insurance companies